Orion Scientific Production Association is a company based in Moscow, Russia. It is part of the Shvabe Holding (Rostec group).

The Orion Scientific Production Association in Moscow is a major designer, developer, and manufacturer of high technology military and aerospace electronics. It also produces special electronics for the space industry, which are used in both space launchers and satellites. In 1991, Orion entered into an agreement with a Russian-French joint venture radio station to produce commercial stereo receivers.

References

External links

  

Electronics companies of Russia
Companies based in Moscow
Shvabe Holding
Aerospace companies of the Soviet Union
Ministry of the Defense Industry (Soviet Union)
Electronics companies of the Soviet Union